Elections to the Puducherry Legislative Assembly were held in June 1991, to elect members of the 30 constituencies in Puducherry (then known as Pondicherry), in India. The Indian National Congress won the popular vote and the most seats, and V. Vaithilingam was appointed as the Chief Minister of Puducherry. The Indian National Congress was in an alliance with the AIADMK.

Results

Elected members

See also
List of constituencies of the Puducherry Legislative Assembly
1991 elections in India

References

External links
  

1991 State Assembly elections in India
State Assembly elections in Puducherry
1990s in Pondicherry